Isogenic human disease models are a family of cells that are selected or engineered to accurately model the genetics of a specific patient population, in vitro. They are provided with a genetically matched 'normal cell' to provide an isogenic system to research disease biology and novel therapeutic agents. They can be used to model any disease with a genetic foundation. Cancer is one such disease for which isogenic human disease models have been widely used.

Historical models
Human isogenic disease models have been likened to 'patients in a test-tube', since they incorporate the latest research into human genetic diseases and do so without the difficulties and limitations involved in using non-human models.

Historically, cells obtained from animals, typically mice, have been used to model cancer-related pathways. However, there are obvious limitations inherent in using animals for modelling genetically determined diseases in humans. Despite a large proportion of genetic conservation between humans and mice, there are significant differences between the biology of mice and humans that are important to cancer research. For example, major differences in telomere regulation enable murine cells to bypass the requirement for telomerase upregulation, which is a rate-limiting step in human cancer formation. As another example, certain ligand-receptor interactions are incompatible between mice and humans. Additionally, experiments have demonstrated important and significant differences in the ability to transform cells, compared with cells of murine origin. For these reasons, it remains essential to develop models of cancer that employ human cells.

Targeting vectors
Isogenic cell lines are created via a process called homologous gene-targeting. Targeting vectors that utilize homologous recombination are the tools or techniques that are used to knock-in or knock-out the desired disease-causing mutation or SNP (single nucleotide polymorphism) to be studied. Although disease mutations can be harvested directly from cancer patients, these cells usually contain many background mutations in addition to the specific mutation of interest, and a matched normal cell line is typically not obtained. Subsequently, targeting vectors are used to 'knock-in' or 'knock out' gene mutations enabling a switch in both directions; from a normal to cancer genotype; or vice versa; in characterized human cancer cell lines such as HCT116 or Nalm6.

There are several gene targeting technologies used to engineer the desired mutation, the most prevalent of which are briefly described, including key advantages and limitations, in the summary table below.

Homologous recombination in cancer cell disease models
Homologous recombination (HR) is a kind of genetic recombination in which genetic sequences are exchanged between two similar segments of DNA. HR plays a major role in eukaryotic cell division, promoting genetic diversity through the exchange between corresponding segments of DNA to create new, and potentially beneficial combinations of genes.

HR performs a second vital role in DNA repair, enabling the repair of double-strand breaks in DNA which is a common occurrence during a cell's lifecycle. It is this process which is artificially triggered by the above technologies and bootstrapped in order to engender 'knock-ins' or 'knockouts' in specific genes5, 7.

A recent key advance was discovered using AAV-homologous recombination vectors, which increases the low natural rates of HR in differentiated human cells when combined with gene-targeting vectors-sequences.

Commercialization
Factors leading to the recent commercialization of isogenic human cancer cell disease models for the pharmaceutical industry and research laboratories are twofold.

Firstly, successful patenting of enhanced targeting vector technology has provided a basis for commercialization of the cell-models which eventuate from the application of these technologies.

Secondly, the trend of relatively low success rates in pharmaceutical RnD and the enormous costs have created a real need for new research tools that illicit how patient sub-groups will respond positively or be resistant to targeted cancer therapeutics based upon their individual genetic profile.

There are several companies working to address this need, a list of the key players and their technology offering is provided below.
 Horizon Discovery: Genesis (rAAV)
 Cellectis:Meganucleases
 Invitrogen: FLP
 Sigma-Aldrich: Zinc Fingers

See also
 AAV
 FLP-FRT recombination
 Genome engineering
 Homologous recombination
 in viruses
 Technological applications
 Cancer therapy
 Plasmid
 Recombinant AAV mediated genome engineering
 Synthetic lethality
 Zinc finger nuclease

References

News

 http://web.mit.edu/piyush/www/diseasemodels.pdf
 http://www.genengnews.com/gen-news-highlights/gsk-to-use-horizon-discovery-s-cell-lines-for-cancer-related-metabolomics-research/78565157/
 http://www.genomeweb.com/biotechtransferweek/horizon-discoverys-umb-cell-line-deal-latest-example-its-academic-collaboration-
 http://www.genomeweb.com/dxpgx/tgen-horizon-discovery-set-pgx-pact 
 https://web.archive.org/web/20120420044126/http://www.tgen.org/news/index.cfm?pageid=57&newsid=1764 TD2
 http://www.businessweekly.co.uk/life-sciences-archive/horizon-hooks-up-with-genentech.html
 https://web.archive.org/web/20110712220150/http://www.horizondiscovery.com/uploads/horizon-downloads/horizon-xman-genesis-faqs.pdf /
 http://www.cellectis.com/genome-engineering/meganucleases/engineered-meganucleases/meganuclease-technologies/
 http://www.sigmaaldrich.com/life-science/zinc-finger-nuclease-technology/custom-zfn.html
 https://web.archive.org/web/20101215173538/http://tools.invitrogen.com/content.cfm?pageid=3375

Sources

 Endogenous Expression of Oncogenic PI3K Mutation Leads to Activated PI3K Signaling and an Invasive Phenotype Poster Presented at AACR/EORTC Molecular Targets and Cancer Therapeutics, Boston, USA, Nov. 2009

 Endogenous Expression of Oncogenic PI3K Mutation Leads to accumulation of anti-apoptotic proteins in mitochondria Poster Presented at AACR 2010, Washington, D.C., USA, April. 2010
 The use of 'X-MAN' isogenic cell lines to define PI3-kinase inhibitor activity profiles Poster Presented at AACR 2010, Washington, D.C., USA, April. 2010
 The use of 'X-MAN' mutant PI3CA increases the expression of individual tubulin isoforms and promoted resistance to anti-mitotic chemotherapy drugs Poster Presented at AACR 2010, Washington, D.C., USA, April. 2010

Human genetics
Genetic engineering
Genetics experiments
Gene banks
DNA